The Lost Treasure (Izgubljeno blago) is a Croatian film written and directed by Darko Vernić-Bundi. It was released in 1996. The film speaks about, an archaeologist together with his son finishes his research on a small Adriatic island, while at the same time expecting his daughter's arrival from Paris. On the basis of his films, a group of criminals try to find where did the man buried the treasure.

References

External links
 

1996 films
Croatian adventure films
1990s Croatian-language films